Jordana is a given name and surname. Notable people with the name include:

Given name 
Jordana Beatty (born 1998), Australian actress
Jordana Brewster (born 1980), American actress
Jordana Mendelson (born 1970), American historian of Spanish art
Jordana (producer), Jordana LeSesne, American musician, producer, DJ, vocalist, activist, and futurist
Jordana (musician), full name Jordana Nye, American musician
Jordana Spiro (born 1977), American film and television actress

Surname or title 
Camélia Jordana, French pop singer
Francisco Gómez-Jordana, 1st Count of Jordana (1876–1944), Spanish soldier and Foreign Minister
Jordi Jordana Rossell (born 1960), Andorran lawyer and politician
Michaele Jordana, Canadian artist and musician